Municipal List was a local political party in Älvdalen, Sweden.

The party was founded as Särnalistan (Särna List), to work for the interest of Särna village within the geographically large municipality. But to the surprise of the party itself, in the 2002 election a fourth of its vote came from outside of Särna. Thus following in April 2005 it took the name Kommunlistan in order to reflect its ambitions as a party for the entire municipality.

In elections it got 408 votes (9.8%) and three seats.

Swedish local political parties